Rodman Wilson Paul (1912–1987) was an American  historian who taught at the California Institute of Technology.  He was known primarily as a foremost authority on California mining and agricultural Native American history.

Life and career
Paul was born in Philadelphia and raised near Boston, Massachusetts.  He received his AB (1936), AM (1937) and PhD (1943) from Harvard. His PhD adviser at Harvard was Frederick Merk.  From 1943 to 1946 he served in the Navy Reserve.  In 1947 he went to Caltech.  His choice for going there was partly based on an interest he developed in the history of the far West after a trip he took to Arizona to recuperate from an illness.  He eventually became the Edward S. Harkness Professor of History.  After retirement in 1972, he continued work as a researcher at the Huntington Library.

Paul wrote many books and articles, and was recognized with several awards including the 1984 Henry R. Wagner Memorial Award. He earned the Guggenheim Fellowship for Humanities award and he was a fellow of the California Historical Society, served on the board of the Pasadena and Santa Barbara historical societies, and was a member of the NASA Historical Advisory Committee.  The Mining History Association's Rodman Paul Award recognizes individuals who have contributed to the understanding of American mining history.

Bibliography
The following is a selected list of the works of Rodman Paul.  Not listed are his many book reviews of works by other authors.

Books

Articles

References

Sources
 
 
 
 

1912 births
1987 deaths
Harvard University alumni
California Institute of Technology faculty
Historians of California
20th-century American historians
20th-century American male writers
American male non-fiction writers